Z7 Operation Rembrandt is a 1966 German-Italian-Spanish Eurospy film written and directed by Giancarlo Romitelli and starring Lang Jeffries. It was shot in Macau, Tangier, Rome, Málaga, and Torremolinos.

Plot

Cast

References

External links

1966 films
Italian spy thriller films
West German films
German spy thriller films
Spanish spy thriller films
1960s spy thriller films
1960s Italian films
1960s German films